Abrdn plc (stylised as ‘abrdn’, disemvoweling of "Aberdeen"), formerly Standard Life Aberdeen plc, is a United Kingdom-based global investment company headquartered in Edinburgh, Scotland. It is listed on the London Stock Exchange and is a constituent of the FTSE 100 Index.

It is the largest active asset manager in the UK, with investments in equities, multi-asset, fixed income, liquidity, sovereign wealth funds, real estate and private markets. In July 2021 the company changed its name from Standard Life Aberdeen to Abrdn. The registered office of the company is at 1 George Street in Edinburgh.

History

In March 2017, Standard Life reached an agreement to merge with Aberdeen Asset Management, in an all-share merger, subject to shareholder approval. It was announced that the merged company was to be named Standard Life Aberdeen. This was achieved by Standard Life being renamed Standard Life Aberdeen on 14 August 2017.

In May 2017, Standard Life acquired the loss-making AXA Portfolio Services for £31 million. This company housed AXA Elevate, the investment platform from Axa. At the time of acquisition the platform held £9.8 billion of client assets, boosting the total level of assets held on Standard Life platforms to £36.4 billion.

In October 2017, it was reported that there had been withdrawals of $10 billion from Standard Life Aberdeen's mutual funds over the prior year.

In February 2018, Standard Life Aberdeen announced its intention to sell the Standard Life insurance business to Phoenix for £3.2 billion, marking a transition away from its insurance roots to asset management.

In October 2018 it was announced that Sir Gerry Grimstone would step down as chairman on 1 January 2019 and be succeeded by Sir Douglas Flint.

In June 2020 it was announced that Keith Skeoch would step down as chief executive and be succeeded by Stephen Bird: he took up the role of chief executive-designate in July 2020, and was formally appointed as chief executive in September 2020.

In September 2020 it was announced that the company would acquire a 60% interest in Tritax, one of Europe's leading logistics real estate fund managers.

In February 2021 the company announced that it was considering selling or abandoning use of the "Standard Life" name. In April 2021, the company announced that, having sold the Standard Life Insurance business to Phoenix in 2018 and having sold the Standard Life name to Phoenix in 2021, it would be rebranding as abrdn. The new brand, pronounced "Aberdeen" and developed by the branding agency Wolff Olins, was criticised as difficult to pronounce, but said by chief executive Stephen Bird to reflect a "clarity of focus". The change of name and the rebranding both took place in July 2021.

In March 2021 the company announced its intention to sell Parmenion, an investment and technology solutions business that supports financial advice firms, to Preservation Capital Partners. The completion of the sale was announced in July 2021.

Abrdn announced in December 2021 that it would acquire Interactive Investor, a British subscription-based retail investment services company with over 400,000 customers. The £1.49 billion purchase was completed in May 2022.

On 1 March 2022, Stephen Bird, the chief executive of Abrdn, announced that the company deemed Russia and Belarus "non-investable", that they were acting to reduce their holdings in the two countries, and that they would not be investing in those countries for the foreseeable future.

Operations
Abrdn is headquartered in Edinburgh, with operations across the globe. , the company has £535 billion assets under management and administration. It has over 5,000 employees globally and over 1 million shareholders.

Abrdn has a primary listing on the London Stock Exchange. It is also listed in the Dow Jones Sustainability Indices (DJSI), including the DJSI World, which ranks the world's leading sustainability-driven publicly listed companies.

See also

List of managers of Standard Life Aberdeen

References

External links
 

Financial services companies established in 2017
2017 establishments in Scotland
British companies established in 2017
Companies based in Edinburgh
Companies listed on the London Stock Exchange
Insurance companies of Scotland
Life insurance companies of the United Kingdom